Yury Aleksandrovich Brychkov (born 29 February 1944 in Moscow, Russia) is a Russian mathematician.

He graduated from Moscow State University in 1966 and worked on quantum field theory at the Steklov Mathematical Institute of the Russian Academy of Sciences, under the supervision of Yuri Mikhailovich Shirokov. He received his PhD in 1971 and he has been with the Dorodnicyn Computing Centre of the Russian Academy of Sciences since 1969.

Yu. A. Brychkov has worked on various topics of pure mathematics, and he has made contributions to the fields of special functions and integral transforms. He has also worked on the computer implementation of special functions at the University of Waterloo, Maplesoft, and Wolfram Research. He is a founding editor of the Journal of Integral Transforms and Special Functions, and has authored a number of handbooks, including the five volume Integrals and Series (Gordon and Breach Science Publishers, 1986–1992).

Works 

 (342 pages)
 (192 pages)
 1981−1986.

 1986−1992.

 (798 pages)
 (750 pages.)
 (800 pages.)
 (Second printing: 1998.) (xviii+618 pages.)
 (xx+595 pages.)

 (386 pages)

 (630 pages)
 (663 pages) 
 (710 pages)
 (xx+680 pages)
 (xx+587 pages)

References

External links 
New Derivatives of the Bessel Functions Have Been Discovered

Living people
1944 births